The 2009 San Marino CEPU Open was a professional tennis tournament played on outdoor red clay courts. It was the twenty-first edition of the tournament which was part of the Tretorn SERIE+ of the 2009 ATP Challenger Tour. It took place in City of San Marino, San Marino between 3 and 9 August 2009.

Singles entrants

Seeds

 Rankings are as of July 27, 2009.

Other entrants
The following players received wildcards into the singles main draw:
  Daniele Bracciali
  Stefano Galvani
  Gastón Gaudio
  Andreas Seppi

The following players received a Special Exempt into the main draw:
  Thiemo de Bakker
  Oleksandr Dolgopolov Jr.

The following players received entry from the qualifying draw:
  Martín Alund
  Dušan Lojda
  Gianluca Naso
  Lukáš Rosol

Champions

Singles

 Andreas Seppi def.  Potito Starace, 7–6(4), 2–6, 6–4

Doubles

 Lucas Arnold Ker /  Sebastián Prieto def.  Johan Brunström /  Jean-Julien Rojer, 7–6(4), 2–6, [10–7]

External links
Official website
ITF Search 
2009 Draws

San Marino CEPU Open
Clay court tennis tournaments
2009 in San Marino